O Axé, a Voz e o Violão is the sixth live album by the Brazilian singer Daniela Mercury, released on September 30, 2016, by Biscoito Fino. With Alexandre Vargas on the guitar, Daniela brings the acoustic set of the MPB and axé music hits. The show was recorded through a partnership of Daniela's office, Páginas do Mar, with the Canal Brasil. The cover was created by the Roda Studio, made it by the photographer Célia Santos.

Track listing

External links

Daniela Mercury albums
2016 live albums